The 1904 Columbia Blue and White football team was an American football team that represented Columbia University as an independent during the 1904 college football season. Robert Stangland was the team captain.

The team's roster included W. E. Metzenthin at quarterback and Tom Thorp at tackle. Metzenthin was selected as a first-team All-American by the New York Herald, and Thorp was selected as a second-team All-American by Walter Camp, Caspar Whitney, and the New York Sun.

Columbia's sports teams were commonly called the "Blue and White" in this era, but had no official nickname. The name "Lions" would not be adopted until 1910.

The team played its home games at the American League Park, a baseball park in the Washington Heights neighborhood of Upper Manhattan in New York City, and also the home field of the New York Yankees.

Schedule

References

Columbia
Columbia Lions football seasons
Columbia Blue and White football